Kaylee Tuck (born May 30, 1994) is an American politician. She has served as a member of the Florida House of Representatives since 2020.

Education and legal career
Tuck's grandmother served on the Highlands County Commission, and her grandfather worked for the Highlands County Sheriff's Office. Tuck's father Andy was a member of the Florida Transportation Commission and later served as vice chair of the Florida State Board of Education. Her mother, Sandee, is a teacher. Kaylee Tuck studied economics at Florida State University, then earned a J.D. degree at the Stetson University College of Law before returning to her hometown, Sebring, Florida, and joining the Henderson, Franklin, Starnes & Holt law firm, where she specialized in land use and real estate law.

Political career
Tuck faced Ned Hancock in a Republican Party primary held on August 18, 2020, to determine the GOP nominee for Florida's 55th House of Representatives district, as the incumbent officeholder, Cary Pigman, was ineligible for reelection due to term limits. She secured the Republican nomination and defeated Democratic Party candidate Linda Tripp in the 2020 Florida House of Representatives election.

External links

Florida House of Representatives - Kaylee Tuck
Kaylee Tuck for Florida House of Representatives

References

1994 births
Living people
21st-century American women politicians
21st-century American politicians
21st-century American lawyers
21st-century American women lawyers
Florida lawyers
People from Sebring, Florida
Florida State University alumni
Stetson University College of Law alumni
Republican Party members of the Florida House of Representatives
Women state legislators in Florida